José do Telhado may refer to:

 José do Telhado (1818-1875), a Portuguese bandit
 José do Telhado (1929 film), a Portuguese silent film
 José do Telhado (1945 film), a Portuguese film
 The Return of José do Telhado, a 1949 Portuguese film